Banyoles is a city of 20,168  inhabitants (2021) located in the province of Girona in northeastern Catalonia, Spain.

The town is the capital of the Catalan comarca "Pla de l'Estany".  Although an established industrial centre many of the inhabitants commute to the nearby city of Girona (12 km to the south).

Banyoles was connected to Girona by the  gauge Palamós–Girona–Banyoles railway, which reached it by 1928. Service on the line continued until 1956.

Lake
Banyoles is most famous for the Lake of Banyoles, a natural lake located in a tectonic depression.

Venues
It was the venue for the rowing events in the 1992 Barcelona Olympics.

The "negro of Banyoles", a controversial piece of taxidermy, was at Darder Museum
(ca)(fr).

Events
Each year a triathlon Premium European Cup (or even an IFC Canoe Marathon World Championship in 2010) is held in Banyoles, the hometown of the Spanish 2011 Champion Carolina Routier. National and regional events take place as well throughout the year, such as the Spanish triathlon championship  and the Championship of Catalonia.

Notable people

Andreu Fontàs football player
Salvador Oliva i Llinàs poet and translator
Irene Rigau politician

References

External links 
 Official Website of Banyoles
 Banyoles, information and culture
 Government data pages 

Municipalities in Pla de l'Estany
Populated places in Pla de l'Estany